Kelly Maureen Regan (née Smith) MLA (born 4 February 1961) is a Canadian politician who has served in the Nova Scotia House of Assembly since 2009, most recently as the MLA for Bedford Basin. She was first elected as the Member for Bedford-Birch Cove. Since is a member of the Nova Scotia Liberal Party.

Early life and education
A native of Kitchener, Ontario, Regan graduated with a Bachelor of Arts from the University of Waterloo in 1984.

Career

Journalism and community involvement 
Regan moved to Nova Scotia in 1984 where she began working at CFDR-AM as a reporter covering municipal politics. Her journalism career continued as news director at ATV / ASN for seven years where she won two awards for health documentaries. This was followed by various media and public relations projects.

Regan has been active in many community organizations, serving as a library volunteer at Sunnyside Schools, a member of the organizing committee of the annual Bedford volunteer awards, as executive member of Ridgevale Homeowners’ Association, and as an elder of Bedford United Church. She also serves as a judge for the Atlantic Journalism Awards. She is also a founding member of the Nova Scotia chapter of Equal Voice, a multi-partisan group dedicated to increasing the number of women elected in Canada.

Politics
In 2009 Regan successfully ran for the Nova Scotia Liberal Party nomination in the riding of Bedford-Birch Cove. She was elected in the 2009 provincial election, defeating Progressive Conservative cabinet minister Len Goucher. The riding was renamed Bedford in 2012 and she was re-elected in this riding in the 2013 provincial election.

On October 22, 2013, following the Liberal victory in the 2013 Nova Scotia general election Regan was appointed to the Executive Council of Nova Scotia to serve as Minister of Labour and Advanced Education and Minister responsible for the Advisory Council on the Status of Women Act. On July 24, 2015, Regan was given an additional role in cabinet as minister responsible for youth.

On June 15, 2017, following the Liberal re-election in the 2017 Nova Scotia general election Premier Stephen McNeil shuffled his cabinet, moving Regan to Minister of Community Services, while keeping her as Minister responsible for the Advisory Council on the Status of Women Act. Regan was Deputy Premier of Nova Scotia in the Rankin government from February 23, 2021 until August 31, 2021. Regan was re-elected in the 2021 election, however the Rankin Liberals lost government becoming the Official Opposition. In August 2022, Liberal Leader Zach Churchill appointed her Deputy Leader of the Official Opposition, Chair of the Legislature’s Public Accounts, and shadow minister for Skills and Labour. She is a member of the Legislature Internal Affairs Committee.

Electoral record

|-

|Nova Scotia Liberal Party|Liberal
|Kelly Regan
|align="right"|5,831
|align="right"|52.69
|align="right"|
|-
 
|Nova Scotia Progressive Conservative Party|Progressive Conservative
|Valerie White
|align="right"|3,388
|align="right"|30.61
|align="right"|
|-
 
|New Democratic Party
|Mike Poworozynk
|align="right"|1,362
|align="right"|12.30
|align="right"|
|-

|}

|-

|Nova Scotia Liberal Party|Liberal
|Kelly Regan
|align="right"|6,081
|align="right"|60.66
|align="right"|
|-
 
|Nova Scotia Progressive Conservative Party|Progressive Conservative
|Joan Christie
|align="right"|2,026
|align="right"|20.21
|align="right"|
|-
 
|New Democratic Party
|Mike Poworozynk
|align="right"|1,701
|align="right"|16.97
|align="right"|
|-

|}

|Nova Scotia Liberal Party|Liberal
|Kelly Regan
|align="right"|4,861
|align="right"|44.48
|align="right"|
|-
 
|New Democratic Party
|Brian Mosher
|align="right"|3,552
|align="right"|32.50
|align="right"|
|-
 
|Nova Scotia Progressive Conservative Party|Progressive Conservative
|Len Goucher
|align="right"|2,268
|align="right"|20.75
|align="right"|
|-

|}

Personal life
Regan married her husband Geoff, who was the Member of Parliament for Halifax West, in December 1993, and has three children, Caitlin, Nicole, and Harrison. She resides in Bedford.

She is the granddaughter in law of John Harrison, daughter in law of Gerald Regan and sister in law of the longest host of CTV News at 5 (previously Live at 5) Nancy Regan and actress Laura Regan, of FOX's Minority Report.

References

External links
 Official website
 Members of the Nova Scotia Legislative Assembly
 Liberal caucus profile

Members of the United Church of Canada
Nova Scotia Liberal Party MLAs
Women MLAs in Nova Scotia
People from Bedford, Nova Scotia
People from Chatham-Kent
University of Waterloo alumni
1961 births
Women government ministers of Canada
Living people
Members of the Executive Council of Nova Scotia
Kelly
21st-century Canadian politicians
21st-century Canadian women politicians